Hannah Brandt (born November 27, 1993) is an American ice hockey centre, currently playing for the Minnesota section of the PWHPA. She was named to the United States women's national ice hockey team, which represented the United States at the 2012 IIHF Women's World Championship. She won the 2012 Minnesota Ms. Hockey Award. She debuted for the U.S. national women's team at the 2014 4 Nations Cup in Kamloops, British Columbia, Canada.

Playing career

High school
With the Hill-Murray Pioneers, she registered 59 goals and 31 assists in 26 games of the 2011–12 campaign. In 2011–12, Brandt had 22 multiple-point and 20 multiple-goal games this season. In addition, she accumulated 13 hat tricks and three six-point games. Her five-year career with the Pioneers resulted in total numbers of 192 goals and 142 assists.  She committed to play at the University of Minnesota along with fellow 2012 Minnesota Ms. Hockey finalists Milica McMillen and Lee Stecklein.

NCAA
Brandt scored 33 goals and made 49 assists in her first season at Minnesota.  Her 82 points were the second most in Division 1 for the 2012–13 season, with only linemate Amanda Kessel tallying more. The team had an undefeated season and won the 2013 NCAA title.  Brandt was one of ten nominees for the Patty Kazmaier Trophy and was named WCHA Rookie of the Year.

In her sophomore season, Brandt had the most assists in Division 1.  She was the top goal scorer on her team, which reached the NCAA championship game.  Brandt again led Minnesota in goals in her junior year, and her team won the 2015 NCAA title by defeating Harvard.  Brandt was named as one of three finalists for the Kazmaier Trophy and as WCHA Player of the Year in both her sophomore and junior seasons.

Her third-period goal against Harvard goaltender Emerance Maschmeyer in the championship game of the 2015 NCAA National Collegiate Women's Ice Hockey Tournament would stand as the game-winning tally for the Golden Gophers.

USA Hockey
Brandt won a gold medal with the United States national under-18 team at the 2011 International Ice Hockey Federation's world championships. In December 2011, she earned the opportunity to train with the U.S. national senior women's team.

She was named to the roster of the United States national women's ice hockey team that competed at the 2015 IIHF Women's World Championship.

On January 1, 2018, Brandt was named to Team USA's roster to represent the United States at the 2018 Winter Olympics. She helped Team USA win their first gold medal since 1998, and finished the tournament with two points in five games.

On January 2, 2022, Brandt was named to Team USA's roster to represent the United States at the 2022 Winter Olympics.

NWHL

In the 2015 NWHL Draft, she was selected second overall, drafted by the Connecticut Whale. On April 27, 2016, her rights were traded to the New York Riveters.

On June 20, 2018, Brandt signed as a free agent with the Minnesota Whitecaps, who shall compete in the 2018–19 NWHL season.

Other
Brandt scored the first goal for Team Americas in a 3-1 win at the 2019 Aurora Games.

Personal life 
Brandt is the only biological child of her parents, Greg and Robin, respectively of German and mixed Danish-Swedish descent. She has an adopted sister, Marissa Brandt. Her parents struggled with infertility for the first 12 years of their marriage and decided to adopt a child. They chose to adopt from South Korea partly because Greg's sister had adopted two boys from that country and adopted an infant girl, naming her Marissa. About two weeks before Marissa was set to arrive in the U.S., the couple found out that Robin was pregnant; she gave birth to Hannah about six months after Marissa joined the family.

The sisters were originally involved in figure skating as small children, but Hannah switched to hockey at age 5, with Marissa following suit a few years later. They then played on the same teams until Marissa graduated from Hill-Murray School a year before Hannah; Marissa went to NCAA Division III school Gustavus Adolphus College while Hannah went to Minnesota. Both won gold medals at the 2017 IIHF Women's World Championships—Hannah for Team USA in the top division, and Marissa for South Korea in Division II (the third level) under her birth name of Park Yoon-jung. The sisters played in the 2018 Winter Olympics.

Career statistics

NCAA

Awards and honors
Minnesota High School hockey All-State selection (2009, 2010, 2011, 2012)
Pioneer Press player of the year 
2012 MVP at Hill-Murray
2012 Minnesota Ms. Hockey Award

NCAA
Finalist, 2014 Patty Kazmaier Award
Top 10 Finalist, 2015 Patty Kazmaier Award
2015 CCM Hockey Women's Division I All-Americans, First Team

WCHA
WCHA Rookie of the Week (Week of October 25, 2012)
WCHA Player of the Week (Week of October 28, 2014)
2015 WCHA Player of the Year
2015 WCHA Scoring Champion

NWHL
VEDA NWHL Player of the Week (Awarded October 8, 2018)

References

External links

1993 births
Living people
American people of Danish descent
American people of German descent
American people of Swedish descent
American women's ice hockey forwards
Ice hockey players from Minnesota
Ice hockey players at the 2018 Winter Olympics
Ice hockey players at the 2022 Winter Olympics
Medalists at the 2018 Winter Olympics
Medalists at the 2022 Winter Olympics
Minnesota Golden Gophers women's ice hockey players
Minnesota Whitecaps players
Olympic gold medalists for the United States in ice hockey
Olympic silver medalists for the United States in ice hockey
People from Vadnais Heights, Minnesota
Professional Women's Hockey Players Association players